Jamie Cook is a former professional rugby league footballer who played as a  at the 2000 World Cup with the Aotearoa Māori side.

Playing career
Cook played for the Northcote Tigers and Marist Richmond Brothers in the Bartercard Cup.

Cook represented the Aotearoa Māori side at the 2000 World Cup, playing in one match. He was again picked for  New Zealand Māori in 2002, playing against Tonga.

References

New Zealand rugby league players
New Zealand Māori rugby league players
New Zealand Māori rugby league team players
Northcote Tigers players
Marist Richmond Brothers players
Rugby league hookers
Rugby league halfbacks
Living people
Year of birth missing (living people)